Harker Point forms the southernmost end of Bristol Island in the South Sandwich Islands.  Although the island was discovered by a British expedition under James Cook in 1775, Harker Point was unnamed until it was surveyed in 1930 by a team on the staff of the Discovery Committee.

See also
History of South Georgia and the South Sandwich Islands

Cited references

Headlands of South Georgia and the South Sandwich Islands